Robert Westbrook may refer to:

Robert T. Westbrook (born 1945), American novelist
Robert B. Westbrook (historian) (born 1950), American historian
Robert B. Westbrook (pilot) (1917–1944), United States Army Air Forces officer and World War II flying ace